Love Approach is an album by American trumpeter Tom Browne that was released by GRP Records in 1980. The song "Funkin' for Jamaica (N.Y.)" topped the U.S. R&B chart for three weeks in October 1980.

Track listing
All tracks composed by Tom Browne, except where indicated
 "Funkin' for Jamaica (N.Y.)" (Browne, Toni Smith) – 4:43
 "Her Silent Smile" – 5:12
 "Forever More" (Don Blackman) – 3:22
 "Dreams of Lovin' You" (Omar Hakim) – 4:20
 "Nocturne" – 5:08
 "Martha" (Browne, Smith) – 3:41
 "Moon Rise" (Lesette Wilson) – 5:15
 "Weak in the Knees" (featuring Viki Sylva) (Sylva) – 4:41

Personnel 
 Tom Browne – trumpet, flugelhorn, synthesizer
 Bob Franceschini – tenor saxophone, handclaps
 Barbara Bellins – flute
 Dave Grusin – piano, electric piano, synthesizer
 Jorge Dalto – piano
 Lesette Wilson – piano, electric piano, synthesizer
 Bernard Wright – piano, electric piano, synthesizer
 Bobby Broom – guitar
 Mike Vinas – guitar
 Sekou Bunch – bass
 Francisco Centeño – bass
 Marcus Miller – bass
 Omar Hakim – drums, handclaps
 Buddy Williams – drums
 Errol "Crusher" Bennett – percussion
 Carol Steele – percussion
 Alvin Flythe – rap, handclaps
 Mike Flythe – rap, handclaps
 Kevin Osborne – rap, handclaps
 Tonni Smith – vocals, handclaps
 Victoria Sylva – vocals, handclaps
 Martha Rojas – handclaps

Charts

Singles

Culture
"Forever More" from Tom Browne's 1980 album, Love Approach, was heard as part of the beginning and end of the broadcast day on the NBC affiliate in Columbus, Ohio, WCMH-TV in the mid 1980s.

References

External links
 Tom Browne-Love Approach at Discogs
Love Approach at [ Allmusic]
 Tom Browne at Soulwalking

1980 albums
Tom Browne (trumpeter) albums
GRP Records albums
Albums produced by Dave Grusin